Oleksandr Mandzyuk (born 10 January 1983 in Vilino, Crimea Oblast, Soviet Union) is a Ukrainian retired professional footballer.

He is the older brother of Vitaliy Mandzyuk, member of Ukraine national football team.

External links
Profile on UFF website 

1983 births
Living people
People from Bakhchysarai Raion
Ukrainian footballers
FC Ihroservice Simferopol players
FC Krasyliv players
FC Lviv players
FC Obolon-Brovar Kyiv players
FC Mariupol players
Ukrainian Premier League players
Association football forwards